Enniskillen Collegiate Grammar School was a secondary school located in Enniskillen, County Fermanagh, Northern Ireland. Informally known as the Collegiate, the school was founded under the name the Enniskillen Royal School for Girls in 1916. This name was changed when the school was taken over by the Fermanagh Regional Education Committee in 1925.

The school opened at its former east Enniskillen location in October 1931. It originally catered for eighty-eight pupils, with only four classrooms. It was the first grammar school in the province to be erected by a public body. At its closure approximately 500 pupils attended the school.

The Collegiate Grammar School merged with Portora Royal School to form the co-educational Enniskillen Royal Grammar School, as from 1 September 2016.

References

External links

Secondary schools in County Fermanagh
Enniskillen